F.C. Fiorentino is a Sanmarinese football club, based in Fiorentino. The club was founded in 1974. Fiorentino currently plays in Girone A of Campionato Sammarinese di Calcio. The team's colors are blue and red.
Until the 2004–05 season the club was known as S.S. Montevito.

Achievements
Campionato Sammarinese di Calcio: 1
 1991–92 (as S.S. Montevito)

Current squad

Former players

  Evgeny Lipen

References

External links
 FSGC website 
eufo.de – Team Squad

 
Association football clubs established in 1974
Football clubs in San Marino
Former Italian football clubs
1974 establishments in San Marino
Fiorentino